George Allan Webbe  (15 January 1854 – 19 February 1925) was an English first-class cricketer and British Army officer.

The son of Alexander Allan Webbe, he was born at Westminster in February 1854. He was educated at Harrow School, where he won the Public Schools' Rackets alongside Alexander Hadow in 1871 and 1872. Following his rackets success in 1872, Webbe became seriously ill which kept him out of the Harrow cricket eleven. From Harrow he went up to University College, Oxford but left after his freshman year to pursue a career in the British Army. He was commissioned in the 15th King's Hussars as a sub-lieutenant in February 1874. In the same year that he joined The King's Hussars, Webbe played in a first-class cricket match for the Gentlemen of Marylebone Cricket Club against Kent at Canterbury, batting once in the match and scoring 9 runs before being dismissed by Edgar Willsher. He was promoted to lieutenant in The King's Hussars in September 1876, antedated to February 1874. 

He made a second appearance in first-class cricket in 1878, for the Marylebone Cricket Club (MCC) against Kent at Canterbury, in which he batted twice and was dismissed in the MCC first innings for 9 runs by William Foord-Kelcey and was unbeaten in their second innings on 19. As a cricketer, he was described in Scores and Biographies as "a really good batsman,an energetic field at cover-point". Scores and Biographies speculated that if Webbe continued in the game that he would "perhaps excel". However, his 1878 appearance would be his last in first-class cricket. He was aide-de-camp to the Inspector-General of Cavalry at Aldershot Garrison, Sir Frederick Fitzwygram, from 1879 to 1884. He gained the rank of captain in October 1882, with his retirement from active service following in March 1886. Webbe later served as a Deputy lieutenant of Aberdeen, to which he was appointed in March 1888. Webbe died in February 1925 at Ascot. His brothers were A. J. and Herbert Webbe, who were also first-class cricketers. He was survived by his wife, Lady Cecilia Leila Hay, daughter of William Hay, 19th Earl of Erroll.

References

External links

1854 births
1925 deaths
People from Westminster
People educated at Harrow School
Alumni of University College, Oxford
15th The King's Hussars officers
English cricketers
Gentlemen of Marylebone Cricket Club cricketers
Marylebone Cricket Club cricketers
Deputy Lieutenants of Aberdeen